is a former Japanese football player.

Club statistics

References

External links

J. League (#24)

1992 births
Living people
Association football people from Shizuoka Prefecture
Japanese footballers
J1 League players
J2 League players
J3 League players
Shimizu S-Pulse players
FC Gifu players
Fukushima United FC players
Association football midfielders